Hunter Doohan (born January 18, 1994) is an American actor, writer and director. He is best known for his roles in the television series Your Honor (2020), and Wednesday (2022).

Life and career
Doohan grew up "all over the south" but chiefly in Fort Smith, Arkansas. He became interested in acting via high school and community theatre programs; after high school he took up an internship at Elizabeth Barnes Casting in Los Angeles before working in a variety of day jobs including background extra, waiter, and Universal Studios tour guide while studying acting and auditioning for parts.

Doohan's breakthrough role was playing the younger version of Aaron Paul's character Warren Cave in the first season of the 2019 Apple TV+ series Truth Be Told. In 2020, he appeared with a main role in the legal drama series Your Honor, playing Adam Desiato. In 2022, he portrayed Tyler Galpin in the Netflix series Wednesday.

Personal life
Doohan is the son of the Australian tennis player Peter Doohan. He has been married to producer Fielder Jewett since June 2022.

Filmography

Television

Film

References

External links

Wednesday’s Hunter Doohan Is Turning Heads - Article in Vogue

1994 births
Living people
20th-century LGBT people
21st-century American male actors
21st-century LGBT people
American LGBT actors
American gay actors
American male television actors
American people of Australian descent
LGBT male actors
LGBT people from Arkansas